Kunaev Home Museum (Russian: Дом-музей Кунаева, tr. dom muzei kunaeva) is a memorial museum and memorial apartments of the politician and First Secretary of the Communist Party of Kazakhstan Dinmukhamed Kunaev in Almaty, Kazakhstan.

History 

The museum consists of two areas: the D. A. Kunaev museum, and the memorial apartments.

Museum 
Museum contains three galleries devoted to Dinmukhamed Kunaev's life and activities. The museum was opened in 2002 on the 90th anniversary of Kunaev's birth in premises provided for this purpose at 177 Tulebayeva Street.

The basis for the creation of the museum was a collection of family memoirs received from relatives: documents, photos, video materials, portraits and household items. Later they were supplemented with contributions from Kunaev's friends and associates. Expositions of the museum show Kunaev's progress from a mining engineer to First Secretary of the Communist Party of Kazakhstan. The museum collections hold about 3,000 exhibits relating to Kunaev's life, and contain materials on the history of Kazakhstan. The exhibition is housed in two halls with a total area of 210 square meters.

Memorial apartment 
In 2012, the 100th anniversary of Kunaev's birth, the apartments which he had lived in between 1969 and 1993 were opened to the public. After Kunaev's death, the apartments were inhabited by his nephew, Diyar Kunaev, who preserved them much as they were when his uncle lived there.

The 230-square-meter apartment features Kunaev's home library of 7,000 books, and a smaller collection of more than 400 copies, personal items and gifts. The museum exhibition consists of four rooms: Kunaev's office, living room, bedroom and kitchen.

In first quarter of 2022 the museum was closed for reconstruction and on 19 April 2022, was reopened after reconstruction was completed.

References 

Museums in Almaty
Museums established in 2002